Oswin Veith (born 1961) is a German politician. Born in Ober-Wöllstadt, Hessen, he represents the CDU. He was a member of the German Bundestag from September 2013 to March 2020.

External links 

 

1961 births
Living people
Members of the Bundestag for Hesse
Members of the Bundestag 2017–2021
Members of the Bundestag 2013–2017
Members of the Bundestag for the Christian Democratic Union of Germany